was a Japanese actor, voice actor and narrator from Taitō, Tokyo. He was best known for voicing Medama Oyaji in nearly every adaptation of Shigeru Mizuki's GeGeGe no Kitarō made during his lifetime.

Career
During his life he had been attached to Gekidan Tōgei and then Theatre Echo; he was attached to Aoni Production at the time of his death. He had a naturally deep voice but became famous for voicing characters with a high pitched voice. In addition to GeGeGe no Kitarō, he also had prominent roles in Tensai Bakabon (as the first voice of Honkan-san), Mazinger Z (as Mucha), Paul's Miraculous Adventure (as Doppe), Magical Princess Minky Momo (as Sindbook), Akuma-kun (as Youaltepuztli), Dr. Slump & Arale-chan (as Gara and Akira Toriyama), Dragon Quest: Dai no Daibōken (as Brass), and the Shin Megami Tensei: Persona series (as Igor).

Medama Oyaji
In 1968, he was cast in the first GeGeGe no Kitarō anime as the title character's father Medama Oyaji, an anthropomorphic eyeball. He reprised the role, alongside co-stars Masako Nozawa (Kitarō) and Chikao Ōtsuka (Nezumi-Otoko), in the 1971 follow up color series. When it came time for the 1980s series the producers decided to go with an all new voice cast, but auditions for Medama Oyaji came up short so Tanonaka was asked to reprise the role yet again. From there he continued to voice the character in practically every adaptation made during his lifetime, the sole exception being the PlayStation 2 games from the early 2000s, in which the role was given to Kazuo Kumakura, and a single episode of the '71 series where Hiroshi Ōtake filled in for him. Tanonaka even performed the voice of Medama Oyaji for the live action adaptations, and also appeared on many variety shows and in many commercials as the character. In 2008, he reunited with Nozawa and Ōtsuka to reprise their respective roles for the darker Kitarō adaptation Hakaba Kitarō. As Medama Oyaji is actually the reanimated form of Kitarō's deceased father, the character was voiced by Daisuke Gōri when he appeared alive in the first episode.

Death
On January 13, 2010, he suffered a heart attack in his Tokyo home and was found dead by family members. He was 77 years old at the time of his death. His final performance was in Marie & Gali as the voice of Leonardo da Vinci. Memorial services were held in Tokyo Memolead Hall on January 19, 2010. He is survived by his older brother Hiroshi.

Roles

Television
1964
Zero Sen Hayato (Ichihisō Hosokawa)
1965
Kaitō Pride (Scope)
Obake no Q-tarō (TBS edition) (Shōta's Papa)
1967
Punpunmaru (Gatekeeper, Narrator)
1968
Akane-chan (Kadomatsu)
Animal 1 (Tōgorō)
GeGeGe no Kitarō (Medama Oyaji)
1969
Hakushon Daimaō (Kan-chan's Papa)
Sazae-san (Ceiling Mouse)
1970
Ashita no Joe (Miss Oyama (episode 35))
1971
GeGeGe no Kitarō (second series) (Medama Oyaji)
Kunimatsu-sama no Otōridai (Odeko)
Tensai Bakabon (Honkan-san)
1972
Mazinger Z (Mucha)
1973
Cutie Honey (Saint Chapel Academy Principal)
Wansa-kun (Roro)
1975
UFO Robo Grendizer (Mucha)
Maya the Honey Bee (Max)
1976
Paul no Miracle Daisakusen (Doppe)
1978
Ginga Tetsudō 999 (President Derumukade (episode 38))
Majokko Tickle (Ago)
1979
Cyborg 009 (Loki, Doctor Rōson)
Ginga Tetsudō 999 (Kokku (episode 53))
1980
Haero Bun Bun (Big)
Moero Arthur Hakuba no Ōji (Sandee)
1981
Dr. Slump & Arale-chan (Gara, Toriyama (Tori Robo), Annai Obake, Dodongadon, Villager, Crow Leader)
Shin Taketori Monogatari: Sennen Joō (Ramen-monger's uncle)
Yattodetaman (Chairman)
1982
Gyakuten! Ippatsuman (Urashima)
Mahō no Princess Minky Momo (Sindbook)
Ochamegami Monogatari Korokoro Poron (Beauty Artist)
1983
Itadakiman (Nika)
Manga Nihonshi (Sesshū)
1985
GeGeGe no Kitarō (third series) (Medama Oyaji)
1987
Dragon Ball (Gara)
1989
Akuma-kun (Youaltepuztli)
Dragon Ball Z (Raichi (episodes 40-44))
Gakiden (Father)
Peter Pan no Bōken (Ton Chihōte)
Ranma ½: Nettōhen (Nikuman #2)
1990
Moomin (Thingumy)
1991
Dragon Quest: Dai no Daibōken (Brass)
Getter Robo Gō (Doctor Tama)
1992
Crayon Shin-chan (Saint)
1993
Kenyū Densetsu Yaiba (Obaba)
1995
Bonobono (Kuzuri-kun's Father)
Dragon Ball Z (Bibidi (episode 277))
1996
Elf wo Karumono-tachi (Jii-chan Elf)
GeGeGe no Kitarō (fourth series) (Medama Oyaji)
1999
Digimon Adventure (Pikkoromon)
2000
Pocket Monsters (Old Man Tsubo)
2002
Final Fantasy: Unlimited (Frog Hermit (episode 17))
2003
One Piece (Shōjō)
2007
GeGeGe no Kitarō (fifth series) (Medama Oyaji)
2008
Hakaba Kitarō (Medama Oyaji)
Negibōsu no Asatarō (Jii-san)
Persona: Trinity Soul (Igor)
2009
Marie & Gali (Leonardo da Vinci)
2011
Persona 4: The Animation (Igor, archived audio)
2014
Persona 4: The Golden Animation (Igor, archived audio)

OVA
Bokuha Ōsama series (Cabinet Minister Wan)
Haja Taisei Dangaiō (Shoulder Clown)
Tengai Makyō: Jiraiya Oboro Hen (Oboke)

Theatrical animation

One Piece: Clockwork Island Adventure (2001) (Boo Jack)
Palme no Ki (2002) (Zakuro)
Persona 3 The Movie: No. 1, Spring of Birth (2013) (Igor, archived audio)
Persona 3 The Movie: No. 2, Midsummer Knight's Dream (2014) (Igor, archived audio)
Persona 3 The Movie: No. 3, Falling Down (2015) (Igor, archived audio)
Persona 3 The Movie: No. 4, Winter of Rebirth (2016) (Igor, archived audio)
 
unknown date
Dr. Slump (Gara)
GeGeGe no Kitarō (Medama Oyaji)
GeGeGe no Kitarō: Daikaijū (Medama Oyaji)
GeGeGe no Kitarō: Gekitotsu!! Ijigen Yōkai no Daihanran (Medama Oyaji)
GeGeGe no Kitarō: Obake Nighter (Medama Oyaji)
GeGeGe no Kitarō: Saikyō Yōkai Gundan! Nippon Jōriku!! (Medama Oyaji)
GeGeGe no Kitarō: Yōkai Daisensō (Medama Oyaji)
GeGeGe no Kitarō: Yōkai Tokkyū! Maboroshi no Kishu (Medama Oyaji)
Gekijōban: GeGeGe no Kitarō: Nippon Bakuretsu (Medama Oyaji)
Mazinger Z tai Ankoku Daishōgun (Mucha)
Mazinger Z tai Devilman (Mucha)
Nagagutsu o Haita Neko (Killer B)
Nagagutsu Sanjūshi (Killer B)
Nagagutsu o Haita Neko: Hachijū Nichi-kan Sekaiisshū (Killer B)
Ultraman USA (Ulysses)
Urusei Yatsura: Itsudatte My Darling (Commanding Officer)

Video games
Dragon Ball: Raging Blast (Rō Kaiōshin)
Dragon Ball Z 3 (Rō Kaiōshin)
Dragon Ball Z Sparking! (Rō Kaiōshin)
Dragon Ball Z Sparking! Meteor (Rō Kaiōshin)
Dragon Knight II (Pharmacist)
GeGeGe no Kitarō (Medama Oyaji)
GeGeGe no Kitarō: Yōkai Daiundōkai (Medama Oyaji)
Jak and Daxter: The Precursor Legacy (Farmer)
One Piece Grand Battle! 3 (Shōjō)
Persona 3 (Igor, Mister Ekoda)
Persona 4 (Igor)
Persona 4 Arena (Igor, archived audio)
Persona 4 Arena Ultimax (Igor, archived audio)
Persona 5 (Igor, archived audio)

Tokusatsu
Chouriki Sentai Ohranger (Bara Baby)

Dubbing roles

Live action
Bewitched ("Daddy Comes for a Visit", "Darrin the Warlock") (Silas Bliss Junior)
The NeverEnding Story (Nighthob (Tilo Prückner))
Star Trek: Deep Space Nine (Grand Nagus Zek (Wallace Shawn))
Star Wars: Episode I – The Phantom Menace (Jar Jar Binks)
Star Wars: Episode II – Attack of the Clones (Jar Jar Binks)

Animation
Alice in Wonderland (TBS edition) (The King of Hearts, The Dormouse)
Aladdin (TV series) (Aziz)
The Flintstones (Barney Rubble)
The Mask: Animated Series (Mayor Mortimer Tilton)
One Hundred and One Dalmatians (Old edition) (Pongo)
Teenage Mutant Ninja Turtles (Video edition) (Krang)
Top Cat (Officer Dibble)

Film
GeGeGe no Kitarō (Medama Oyaji (voice))
GeGeGe no Kitarō: Sennen Noroi Uta (Medama Oyaji (voice))

Radio
Seishun Adventure ("Fengshen Yanyi") (NHK-FM) (Yúnzhōngzǐ)

Other
Gakkō no Kaidan (Trailer voice-over)
 Kitaro ga Mita Gyokusai - Mizuki Shigeru no Senso (2007) (Medama Oyaji's voice)
Masudaya Corporation Mōrā commercial (1975) (Mōrā (voice))
Nep League (May 7, 2007) (Medama Oyaji's voice)

References

External links
 Official agency profile 
 
 
 

1932 births
2010 deaths
Japanese male video game actors
Japanese male voice actors
Male voice actors from Tokyo
People from Taitō
Aoni Production voice actors